Gerald Edward Davis (born December 25, 1958) is an American former Major League Baseball player and outfielder who appeared in 49 games over parts of two seasons,  and , for the San Diego Padres.

Amateur career
A native of Trenton, New Jersey, Davis graduated from Ewing High School and Howard University. In 1978, he played collegiate summer baseball with the Harwich Mariners of the Cape Cod Baseball League and was named a league all-star. He was drafted by the Padres in the sixth round of the 1980 Major League Baseball draft.

Professional career
Davis' professional career extended for six seasons (1980–1985 and 1987), and included strong showings in levels ranging from Class A to Triple-A. He was selected an All-Star in the Carolina League (1981) and Pacific Coast League (1983). During his two stints with the Padres, he collected 22 hits, with five doubles and a triple and three runs batted in. He batted .301. The bulk of his MLB service time came in 1985, when he got into 44 games and started seven games in right field and two games in left field. A knee injury suffered in January 1986 caused him to miss the entire 1986 season and curtailed his playing career. He retired from professional baseball after spending 1987 in the minors.

References

External links
, or Retrosheet, or Pura Pelota (Venezuelan Winter League)

1958 births
Living people
African-American baseball players
Amarillo Gold Sox players
Baseball players from Trenton, New Jersey
Cardenales de Lara players
American expatriate baseball players in Venezuela
Ewing High School (New Jersey) alumni
Harwich Mariners players
Hawaii Islanders players
Howard Bison baseball players
Howard University alumni
Lakeland Tigers players
Las Vegas Stars (baseball) players
Major League Baseball outfielders
People from Ewing Township, New Jersey
Salem Redbirds players
San Diego Padres players
Tiburones de La Guaira players
Toledo Mud Hens players
Walla Walla Padres players
Wichita Pilots players
21st-century African-American people
20th-century African-American sportspeople